Biled is a commune in Timiș County, Romania. It is composed of a single village, Biled. It also included two other villages until 2004, when they were split off to form the commune of Șandra.

Geography 
Biled is located in the Banat Plain, in the western part of Timiș County, 27 km northwest of Timișoara on DN6.

Climate 
Like most of Timiș County, the climate is continental. The climate gets Mediterranean influences from the south. It has a temperate character (the annual mean temperature being 10.5 °C), with hot summers, not too cold winters, quite early springs and sometimes very long autumns. The average annual rainfall is 520 mm, with variations from 350 to 730 mm. Most precipitation falls during spring–summer in May–August, with torrential rains accompanied by hail. The dominant wind is the austru, a dry wind from the south, which blows almost all year round.

Flora and fauna 
The dominant vegetation is grassy. Trees are mainly represented by black locusts, mulberries and poplars, and shrubs by blackthorn and hawthorn. The most common weeds, many of them harmful to agricultural crops, are thistles, blackberries, cornflowers, poppies, oraches, and lately sorghum has spread.

Regarding the fauna, this area is suitable for hares, sousliks, hamsters, steppe polecats, and among the bird species can be mentioned the quail, the partridge, the skylark, the pheasant and the starling.

History 

Biled was first documented in 1462 (Bylyed) as belonging to nobleman Nicolae of Beregsău, but it is probably older. A treasure consisting of about 2,000 coins of bronze, silver and gold issued from Trajan to Constantine the Great was discovered in 1847. The treasure is preserved in the Numismatic Cabinet of the Kunsthistorisches Museum in Vienna. Also here were found the vestiges of several Daco-Roman settlements dating from the 3rd–4th centuries.

In 1562 Biled became royal property, being donated by King Ferdinand I to chatelaine László Kerecsényi. Biled received the status of urban settlement in 1609, allowing it to host monthly and annual fairs. It became deserted during the Ottoman occupation. Towards the end of the 17th century, a Serbian population under the guidance of Patriarch Arsenie Csernovici settled in Biled. The German colonization took place in a first stage in 1765 and in a second stage between 1768 and 1775. By 1786 Biled had the status of urban settlement. The church was built in the same year.

Demographics 

Biled had a population of 3,294 inhabitants at the 2011 census, down 6% from the 2002 census. Most inhabitants are Romanians (83.12%), larger minorities being represented by Roma (4.1%), Hungarians (3.7%) and Germans (2.58%). For 6.16% of the population, ethnicity is unknown. By religion, most inhabitants are Orthodox (77.66%), but there are also minorities of Roman Catholics (10.26%) and Pentecostals (3.43%). For 6.41% of the population, religious affiliation is unknown.

References 

Communes in Timiș County
Localities in Romanian Banat